De Abrew is a Sinhalese surname derived from the Portuguese surname De Abreu.

Notable people
 Alexander Nicholas de Abrew Abeysinghe (1894-1963), Sri Lankan Sinhala politician
 Owen de Abrew (born 1920), Sri Lankan ballroom dancer
 Peter De Abrew (1862–1940), Ceylonese industrialist
 Sarath de Abrew (c. 1953–2016), Sri Lankan judge
 Sisira de Abrew, Sri Lankan judge

See also
 

Sinhalese surnames